Henry B. Vasconcellos (April 30, 1911 – February 26, 1996) was an American football coach and college athletics administrator. He served as the head football coach at the University of Hawaiʻi at Mānoa from 1952 to 1960.

Vasconcellos died on February 26, 1996, at the age of 84.

Head coaching record

References

1911 births
1996 deaths
Hawaii Rainbow Warriors and Rainbow Wahine athletic directors
Hawaii Rainbow Warriors football coaches
High school basketball coaches in Hawaii
High school football coaches in Hawaii
High school track and field coaches in the United States
Kamehameha Schools alumni
San Jose State University alumni
Coaches of American football from Hawaii
Basketball coaches from Hawaii